Jones is an unincorporated community in Morehouse Parish, Louisiana, United States. Jones has a post office with ZIP code 71250.

References

Unincorporated communities in Morehouse Parish, Louisiana
Unincorporated communities in Louisiana